DXME (100.1 FM), broadcasting as E100.1 Love Radio, is a radio station owned and operated by Manila Broadcasting Company. The station's studio and transmitter are located at the 3rd Floor, Velarde Bldg., General Santos Dr., Koronadal.

References

Radio stations in South Cotabato
Love Radio Network stations
Radio stations established in 2011